Hollywood is an American drama streaming television miniseries starring an ensemble cast including David Corenswet, Darren Criss, Laura Harrier, Joe Mantello, Dylan McDermott, Jake Picking, Jeremy Pope, Holland Taylor, Samara Weaving, Jim Parsons, and Patti LuPone. Created by Ryan Murphy and Ian Brennan, it was released on Netflix on May 1, 2020.

The miniseries is about a group of aspiring actors and filmmakers during the Hollywood Golden Age in the post-World War II era trying to make their dreams come true. The series received mixed reviews from critics who praised the acting and production values, but criticized the tone, writing, and artistic license taken. The series received 12 nominations at the 72nd Primetime Emmy Awards, including acting nods for Pope, Taylor, McDermott, and Parsons, winning two.

Premise 
The series explores Hollywood in 1946-1949, following World War II where traditional power dynamics in the American film industry are systematically dismantled and racism and homophobia are assigned to the dustbin of history.

Cast and characters

Main

 David Corenswet as Jack Castello, a World War II veteran who moves to Hollywood in hopes of becoming an actor
 Darren Criss as Raymond Ainsley, a half-Filipino aspiring film director hoping to break boundaries in Hollywood, and Camille's boyfriend
 Laura Harrier as Camille Washington, an up-and-coming Black actress facing prejudice because of her race, and Raymond's girlfriend
 Joe Mantello as Richard "Dick" Samuels, a studio executive at Ace Studios who is a closeted gay man. Hank Stuever of The Washington Post describes him as "intimidating but receptive".
 Dylan McDermott as Ernest "Ernie" West, a pimp, based on Scotty Bowers, who runs his business out of a gas station and recruits Jack
 Jake Picking as Roy Fitzgerald / Rock Hudson, a fictionalized version of the actor, and Archie's boyfriend. Liz Cantrell of Town & Country magazine characterized this version of Rock Hudson as "a young unknown...trying to make his way in the world, and beginning to understand who he really is."
 Jeremy Pope as Archie Coleman, a Black aspiring screenwriter facing prejudice, and Roy's boyfriend
 Holland Taylor as Ellen Kincaid, a studio executive and mentor for aspiring actors at Ace Studios. Cantrell wrote that the character "gets what she wants and knows a star when she sees one."
 Samara Weaving as Claire Wood, an up-and-coming actress, Camille's rival, and the daughter of Ace and Avis Amberg. Cantrell described her as "an ambitious up-and-comer".
 Jim Parsons as Henry Willson, a fictionalized version of the Hollywood talent agent whose clients included Rock Hudson
 Patti LuPone as Avis Amberg, wife of Ace Amberg, the head of Ace Studios, and a former actress

Recurring

 Maude Apatow as Henrietta Castello, Jack's wife who is pregnant with twins and works as a waitress. Robert Lloyd of the Los Angeles Times wrote that the character serves "largely as a millstone" and that the storyline does not give a lot of "attention" to her.
 Mira Sorvino as Jeanne Crandall, a successful but aging actress, Ace's mistress, and Camille's scene partner
 Michelle Krusiec as Anna May Wong, a fictionalized version of the Chinese-American actress, whom Raymond tries to help

Guest

 Rob Reiner as Ace Amberg, the head of Ace Studios and the husband of Avis
 Brian Chenoweth as Lon Silver, Ace's attorney
 Jake Regal as Erwin Kaye, a man Henrietta works with and has an affair with
 William Frederick Knight as Harry Golden, a veteran film editor at Ace Studios
 Queen Latifah as Hattie McDaniel, a fictionalized version of the actress, who gives Camille advice
 Katie McGuinness as Vivien Leigh, a fictionalized version of the actress
 Paget Brewster as Tallulah Bankhead, a fictionalized version of the actress
 Harriet Sansom Harris as Eleanor Roosevelt, a fictionalized version of the First Lady and Avis's friend
 Daniel London as George Cukor, a fictionalized version of the director and producer known for his grand house parties
 Billy Boyd as Noël Coward, a fictionalized version of the playwright, composer, director, and actor
 Alison Wright as Ms. Roswell, the gatekeeper to Ace Studios

Episodes

Production

Development
On February 23, 2019, it was announced that Netflix had given the production a straight-to-series order consisting of seven episodes. The series was created by Ian Brennan, and Ryan Murphy. Brennan and Murphy were also set to executive produce the series alongside Darren Criss and David Corenswet. The series was released on May 1, 2020.

Casting
On September 3, 2019, it was reported that Patti LuPone, Holland Taylor, Darren Criss, Jeremy Pope, Dylan McDermott, Jim Parsons, Corenswet and Joe Mantello had been cast in series regular roles.

Reception
On Rotten Tomatoes, the series holds an approval rating of 58% based on 130 reviews, with an average rating of 6.10/10. The site's critical consensus reads: "With its heart on its sleeve and style to spare, Hollywood is anything but subtle – if only its good intentions were paired with a less convoluted story." On Metacritic, the series has a weighted average score of 55 out of 100, based on 33 critics, indicating "mixed or average reviews".

Writing for the Chicago Sun-Times, Richard Roeper gave the series two-and-a-half stars out of four, saying: "It's a fascinating blend of fact (or least stories based on factual characters) and fiction, and the performances from the cast of rising stars and reliable veterans are dazzling — but like many a motion picture, Hollywood can't overcome script problems that surface about midway through the story."

Conversely, Hugh Montgomery of the BBC described the series as "spineless and inert", giving it one out of five stars and saying "A show about Tinseltown that chose to confront and prod at these continuing, dispiriting realities rather than concoct its own vapid, hubristic fantasies would be worth 10 times this one." Similarly, The Guardians Lucy Mangan criticized its "counterfactual history", giving the series a two out of five-star review, writing: "This should be the perfect set-up for a scabrous look at prejudice, corruption, the trading of sexual currency, coercion, the well-oiled machinations that underlie an industry and how it all shapes history — all through a #MeToo lens. But it becomes a mere wish-fulfilment fantasy that, whether it intends to or not, suggests that if a few people had just been that bit braver, then movies – and therefore the world! — would be a glorious, egalitarian Eden. It is a show that is smug and obtuse enough to believe la la land's self-regarding idea that celluloid art directly shapes our lives."

While FAULT Magazine praised the show for its beautiful work on costume design and career topping performances of Dylan McDermott, Jeremy Pope and Samara Weaving, they criticised the show's dangerous embellishment of systemic prejudice of post-war USA. "The only ones who benefit from the erasure of Hollywood's brutal history of racism and homophobia, are those that perpetrated it."

Feature articles in Vanity Fair, Esquire, Town & Country, and Rolling Stone covered the Netflix production as depicting the real-life story of Scotty Bowers, but no reference is made to Bowers or his tell-all book, Full Service: My Adventures in Hollywood and the Secret Sex Lives of the Stars in the Netflix production's credits.

Accolades

References

External links
 
 
 Official trailer

2020 American television series debuts
2020 American television series endings
2020s American drama television miniseries
2020s American LGBT-related drama television series
Cultural depictions of actors
Cultural depictions of Cole Porter
Cultural depictions of Eleanor Roosevelt
Cultural depictions of film directors
Gay-related television shows
English-language Netflix original programming
Race and ethnicity in television
Television series about filmmaking
Television series about show business
Television series created by Ryan Murphy (writer)
Television series set in the 1940s
Television series set in 1948
Television shows set in Los Angeles